Charlotte Crutchfield (born December 8, 1963) is an American politician from Maryland. She is a Democratic member of the Maryland House of Delegates who currently represents Maryland House of Delegates District 19 in Montgomery County.

Early life and career
Crutchfield was born in Chicago, Illinois on December 8, 1963. She attended Howard University, where she earned a bachelor's degree in economics in 1986, and the Boston College School of Law, where she earned a Juris Doctor in 1989. She was an assistant state's attorney for Montgomery County from 1991 to 1992. She also served as an associate general counsel at Gulfstream Aerospace from 1996 to 2002. Crutchfield is a practicing attorney in the area of employment law.

Crutchfield first ran for the House of Delegates in 2014, coming in fourth place with 15.7 percent of the vote. She expressed a "very strong interest" in running again in 2018, eventually filing to run on January 10, 2018. She came in second place in the Democratic primary election, receiving 17.6 percent of the vote.

In the legislature
Charlotte Crutchfield was sworn into the Maryland House of Delegates on January 9, 2019. She, along with Jheanelle Wilkins and Pamela Queen, became the first Black women elected to represent Montgomery County in the House of Delegates.

On May 20, 2020, Crutchfield wrote a letter to Governor Larry Hogan urging him to grant clemency to Eraina Pretty, the longest-serving female prisoner in Maryland, after she tested positive for COVID-19. Crutchfield wrote, "Though she was convicted of a violent crime, she is not a violent person. There is no reason to believe that if Ms. Pretty were released she would pose a danger to society." A Baltimore circuit judge granted the release of Pretty on December 14, 2020.

Committee assignments
 Member, Judiciary Committee, 2019–present (family law subcommittee, 2019–2020; public safety subcommittee, 2019–2020; chair, juvenile law subcommittee, 2020; member, civil law & procedure subcommittee, 2021–present; chair, family & juvenile law subcommittee, 2021–present)

Other memberships
 Secretary, Legislative Black Caucus of Maryland, 2019–present
 Member, Maryland Legislative Transit Caucus, 2019–present
 Member, Maryland Veterans Caucus, 2019–present
 Member, Women Legislators of Maryland, 2019–present
 Member, Maryland Legislative Latino Caucus, 2021–present

Personal life
Crutchfield is a military widow. She has two children and lives in Silver Spring, Maryland.

Political position

Criminal justice
Crutchfield introduced legislation during the 2021 legislative session that would allow individuals convicted of first-degree murder as minors to have their convictions reviewed.

During the 2019 legislative session, Crutchfield introduced legislation to create a separate, pre-release mediation unit for women in the state prison system. She introduced legislation during the 2021 legislative session that would repeal the prohibition on prosecuting sexual crimes against a victim who is the spouse of the assailant. The bill passed the House of Delegates by a vote of 125-4. The bill was re-introduced during the 2022 legislative session, during which it passed the House of Delegates by a vote of 125-6 and the Senate by 46-0.

Crutchfield introduced legislation during the 2022 legislative session that would allow hate crime victims to bring civil action against the person who committed the act. The bill passed the House of Delegates by a vote of 94-41.

Marijuana
During her 2018 campaign, Crutchfield said that she would vote to legalize recreational marijuana. During her first term, Crutchfield co-sponsored various bills to automatically expunge legal records related to marijuana possession.

Electoral history

References

External links
 
 

21st-century American politicians
21st-century American women politicians
African-American state legislators in Maryland
Living people
Maryland lawyers
Democratic Party members of the Maryland House of Delegates
People from Silver Spring, Maryland
Women state legislators in Maryland
1963 births
21st-century African-American women
21st-century African-American politicians
20th-century African-American people
20th-century African-American women